Neofriseria sceptrophora is a moth of the family Gelechiidae. It is found in Afghanistan and Turkey.

The wingspan is about 9 mm. The forewings are ochreous-whitish, rather thinly irrorated (speckled) fuscous and with a small black linear dot beneath the costa near the base. The stigmata are large and blackish, the plical obliquely before the first discal, connected with the base by a strong blackish streak. There are a few black scales scattered along the posterior costal and terminal edge. The hindwings are pale greyish.

References

Moths described in 1926
Neofriseria
Insects of Turkey